The 1994–1995 Úrvalsdeild kvenna was the 38th season of the Úrvalsdeild kvenna, then known as 1. deild kvenna, the top tier women's basketball league in Iceland. The season started on 1 October 1994 and ended on 2 April 1995. Breiðablik won its first title by defeating Keflavík 3–0 in the Finals.

Competition format
The participating teams played each opponent three times for a total of 24 games. The top four teams qualified for the championship playoffs while none were relegated to Division I due to vacance berths.

Regular season

Playoffs

Semifinals

|}

Final

|}

Source: 1998 playoffs

Awards
All official awards of the 1995–96 season.

Domestic Player of the Year

Playoffs MVP

Domestic All-First Team

Best Young Player Award

Source

References

External links
Official Icelandic Basketball Federation website

Icelandic
Lea
Úrvalsdeild kvenna seasons (basketball)